The following are all the contributing resources to the Saint Anthony Falls Historic District in Minneapolis, Minnesota, United States. The District is on the National Register of Historic Places, thus these properties are on the NRHP. The "period of significance" of the District was 1858–1941. The district's archaeological record is considered to be one of the most-endangered historic sites in Minnesota.

The Historic District
The City Beautiful idea of progress was to replace old buildings with grander new buildings (like the Minneapolis Post Office and Pillsbury Library). The Gateway clearance in downtown Minneapolis tore down the now revered Metropolitan Building in 1961. That raised thoughts of historic preservation (thoughts that didn't include the industrial falls area).

By then on the west bank most the flour mills had been torn down, with gravel storage on many of the sites. Waterpower use ended 1960. A few mills operated into the 1960s, with the end of milling, at the Washburn A mill about 1965. In 1969 four of the former flour mills remained standing. For all the historic buildings, use became abandonment, warehousing, light industry, or in one case animal rendering. Second St. had railroad tracks.

On the east bank the mighty Pillsbury A mill ended waterpower use 1955, had limited specialty flour milling after 1975, and ended milling in 2003. Three of the four Main Street historic buildings went from commercial to industrial to empty or storage.

The National Historic Preservation Act of 1966 promoted historic preservation and created the National Register of Historic Places. Minneapolis created the St. Anthony Falls Historic District, and it was added to the NRHP in 1971. The original filing included 21 existing structures. Minneapolis had decided the riverfront and its history was an amenity that could attract people.

In  1980,  the Minneapolis  Park Board proposed extending the West River Parkway from Plymouth Ave. through the mill district. That triggered a section 106 review. The review found numerous archaeological remains in the mill area, particularly under gravel piles on the river side of the power canal. Remains were also found between the falls and Plymouth Ave.

A great deal of public money has been spent in the Historic District, both on public entities, like the Mill City Museum and Mill Ruins Park, but also (including tax credits) on private redevelopment of historic structures.

A lot was learned about the Historic District, and the NRHP nomination was amended in 1991 with  much more narrative on the significance plus over four times the entities. A lot of the additions were the archeological remains and the individual houses on Nicollet Island. 

Note that from the falls downstream the river floes substantially to the east. In this area the "east bank" is "north" and upstream is "west"

Extant

St. Anthony Falls Waterpower Area
Use of waterpower at  the falls goes back to an 1821 sawmill and an 1823 grist mill, both built by Ft. Snelling. As soon as the area was opened up to white settlement. the land was claimed to get the waterpower rights. The falls was a major saw mill center, then from 1880 to 1930 had the largest flour production in the US. In 1881 the third central station hydroelectric  plant in the US was built (for arc lights). Two major hydroelectric plants were built (1894/1911 and 1908) with a third plant (1895) just downstream. One of these plants is still operating. Other industries have also been powered by the falls. Minneapolis developed around these industries. A major part of the District is the remains of these industries (some literally archeological remains).
 Bridge No. L-8900, crosses S 1st. St., E of  3rd Ave. S.   [1891- ]
 Crown Roller Mill/ Consolidated "A" mill, 105 5th Ave. S.   [1880,1908- ]
The Crown Roller Mill had the third highest flour production at the Falls. It was the first large mill that used gradual-reduction roller milling and middlings purifiers. Production ended 1953 and the building was used for warehouse and light industry. A disastrous 1983 fire destroyed the interior, the roof, and part of one wall. A new interior was built in the shell and a mansard roof restored. The renovation substantially restored the appearance and the building is still a contributing resource.  The mill and attached boiler house are now an office building. data pages The report documents the mill after the 1983 fire and before the 1987 redevelopment.
 Falls of St. Anthony
 Falls of St. Anthony Apron [1866, 1880. 1952- ]
Originally a wood timber sloping spillway for the river, the apron protected the falls and stopped the upstream progression and, when originally built, prevented damage from logs that escaped from the then prevalent sawmills. The wood apron was replaced with a concrete one in 1952 and is the very visible spillway.
 Falls of St. Anthony Dike   [1876- ]
A concrete wall across the river under he limestone cap to fix the Eastman tunnel disaster.
 Falls of St. Anthony Dam (Horseshoe/upper dam)   [1858- ] 
 Falls of St. Anthony, East Channel Escarpment   Hennepin Island E of access road extension of 3rd Ave SE
Location of the waterfall in the east channel (now blocked) of the river around Hennepin Island. It is the only exposed instance of the original falls.
 Hall and Dann Barrel Company Factory, 111 3rd Ave. S.   [1880,1888- ] 
 Hennepin Island Hydroelectric Plant, central Hennepin Island   [1908- ]
 Humboldt Flour Mill/ Washburn "E" Mill, 710-714 S. 2nd S.  [1878- ] (now historic part of Humboldt Lofts Condos) 
 Log Sluice, N side of Main Street Station to escarpment   [1898- ]
 Main Street Hydroelectric Station, 206 Main St. SE   [1911- ]
 Martin and Morrison Block, 127-129 Main St. SE  [1858- ]
 Minneapolis Eastern Railway Company Engine House, 333 S. 1st St.   [1914- ]
 North Star Woolen Mill, 109 Portland Ave.   [1885, 1922, 1925- ] (now North Star Lofts)
 Northwestern Consolidated Milling Company Elevator A (Ceresota Elevator), 155 5th Ave S. [1908- ] (now Millers Landing Senior Living) 
 Pillsbury "A" Mill Complex, 301 Main St. SE.   [1881- ]
The A-mill and four adjacent buildings in the complex were redeveloped into the income limited A-mill Artist Lofts  (2015). The Concrete Elevator on 2nd St. SE is also part of the complex.
 Pillsbury "A" Mill Transformer Building, Hennepin Island W of the substation   [1918- ]
There does not appear to be a building as described at the location described.
 Pillsbury Industrial Equipment/ Pillsbury Machine Shop, 300 Second St. SE   [1916- ] (now an event venue, cocktail lounge 2016)
 Pillsbury Warehouse #2, 129 Fifth Ave. SE   [1919- ]
Part of the 2015 redevelopment to the income limited A-mill Artist Lofts 
 Pracna Building, 117 Main St. SE   [1890- ]
 Salisbury & Satterlee Company Complex, 201–205; 219 Main St. SE  [1885, 1892, 1906, 1909- ]
 St. Anthony Falls Hydraulic Laboratory, on Hennepin Island   [1938- ]
 St. Anthony Falls Water Power Co. Canal/ Pillsbury Canal, from a gate house at 2nd Ave SE and the river then under Main St. to the mid south wall of the Pillsbury A mill.   [1881- ]
The tunnel (it was never a canal) was the headrace for the Pillsbury "A" mill turbines (also the Phoenix mill).  As part of the redevelopment of the A-mill complex into income limited A-Mill Artist Lofts a penstock pipe was added to the tunnel to supply a new hydroelectric generator in the downstream turbine pit.
 St. Anthony Falls Water Power Co. Tailrace/ Chute Tunnel, under Main St. SE, from about 3rd Ave to 5th Ave SE  [1864, 1874- ]
 Standard Flour Mill/ Northwestern Consolidated "F" mill (Whitney Hotel), 150 Portland Ave.   [1879- ]
 Stone Arch Bridge  [1883- ]
 Upton Block/ Union Iron Works, Main St. & 2nd Ave SE   [1855- ]  (now Aster Cafe)
 Washburn, Crosby & Company "A" Flour Mill (Washburn "A" Mill Complex), 701 1st St S  [1880+- ]  
The A-mill complex had many buildings, most of which became the Mill City Museum. The complex also includes:
- Washburn-Crosby No. 1 Elevator [1908- ] 15 (3x5) large diameter circular elevators on the north east corner of the complex with " Gold Medal Flour" signs on top: the elevators were among the first to use the circular reinforced-concrete form pioneered by Peavey–Haglin (1900)
- Utility Building, 700  2nd St S,  [1914- ] a completely separate building (now Washburn Lofts)
- Washburn-Crosby Feed Elevator [1928- ] 15 (3x5) smaller diameter circular elevators west of Elevator No. 1
 Washburn-Crosby Company Train Shed, 700 Block of 1st St. S.   [1918- ]

Nicollet Island Residential Area
The upstream end of Nicollet Island had historic houses of varying architectural styles, and developed as a predominantly  middle and working class neighborhood. Plans for redeveloping Nicollet Island were to demolish the houses for a park. The Minneapolis Housing and Redevelopment agency started buying properties in 1968. Residents wanted the houses to remain. In an epic struggle the residents won in 1983.
 Adams-Barquist House, 177 Nicollet St.
 Andrew and Ole Loberg House, 171 E. Island Ave.
 Andrew and Ole Loberg House, 175 E. Island Ave.
 Backe-Barquist House, 91 Nicollet St.
 Baker-Leber House, 95 W. Island Ave.
 Barquist-Holmberg House, 167-169 Nicollet St.
 Brookins, George, W., House, 163 Nicollet St.
 Griswold, Franklin G., House, 15-17 Maple Pl.
 Griswold, Franklin, G., House, 107-109 W. Island Ave.
 Grove St. Flats (Eastman Flats), 2-16 Grove St. [1877- ]
 house, 27 Maple Pl.
 house, 18-20 Maple Pl.
 John Mayell House (also listed as "Mayall, John, House"), 93 Nicollet St.
 Meader-Farnham House, 103-105 W. Island Ave.
 Murphy, Edward, House, 167-169 E. Island Ave.
 O'Brien-Meyer House, 185-186 E. Island Ave.
 Pease, R.M.S, House, 101 W. Island Ave.
 Pye, James, House, 163 E. Island Ave.
 William D. Burnett Tenement, 111-113 W. Island Ave.
 Woodward Flat Duplex, 183-184 E. Island Ave.
 Woodward Flat Fourplex, 187-190 E. Island Ave.

Other
 Ard Godfrey House, Ortman St (Chute Square)  [1849- ]
The Ard Godfrey house, built for Godfrey  in 1848, is the oldest remaining frame house in the Twin Cities. Godfrey came to St. Anthony as the first millwright to build the first commercial sawmill at the falls for Franklin Steele. Godfrey and family lived in the house from 1849 to 1853. The house, originally built approximately behind what is now Pracna, has been moved 4 times to preserve it and at its present location on Chute Square has been extensively restored. It has been a museum open for tours.
 Island Sash and Door Factory, 95 Merriam Street  [1893- ]  (now Nicollet Island Inn)
 Lucy Wilder Morris Park, 6th St SE and river bank
 Minneapolis Post Office - Main Station, 201 1st St. S  [1932- ]
 Old Main Street (Main St. SE)
 Our Lady of Lourdes Catholic Church, 21 SE Prince Street  [1858- ]
 Pillsbury Public Library, 100 University Ave. SE  [1904- ]
 Third Avenue Bridge  [1917- ]

Razed (but with archeological remains)

Associated with the West Bank Power Canal
The falls was the  leading US flour milling center from 1880 to 1930. In the following decline many of the west bank mills were demolished in the 1930s. Into the 1960s most of the rest of the west bank mills  were demolished or abandoned. Mills were demolished to the ground surface, leaving foundations, drop shafts, tailraces, headraces and sometimes turbines intact. Abandonment of the riverfront meant those remains were not destroyed by new development. Many of these sites are part of the Mill Ruins Park.
 Alaska Flour Mill/ Pillsbury "B" Flour Mill [1866, 1882-1931]
 Anchor Flour Mill  [1874-1937]
 Arctic Flour Mill/ St. Anthony Flour Mill/ Northwestern Consolidated "H" Mill [1866- ~1920]
 Cataract Flour Mill  [1859-1928]
 Clapp Woolen Mill/ Empire Mill/ Pillsbury "B" Elevator  [1865, 1888-1969]
 Columbia Flour Mill/ Northwestern Consolidated "B" Mill [1882-1940s]
 First Bassett Sawmill/ Second City Waterworks/ Northwestern Consolidated - storage  [1866. 1871-1930s]
 First City Waterworks/ Holly Flour Mill [1867- ~1920]
 Galaxy Flour Mill/ Northwestern Consolidated "C" Mill  [1874, 1875, 1879-1931]
 Minneapolis and St. Louis Railroad Wheelhouse [1878- ~1960]
 Minneapolis Cotton Mill/ Excelsior Flour Mill  [1870-1900s]
 Minneapolis Eastern Railroad Trestle Piers  [1890-1962]
 Minneapolis Flour Mill/ Washburn Crosby "D" Mill  [1865, 1881-1931]
 Minneapolis Mill Co. Gatehouse & Power Canal  [1858, 1867, 1885-1960]
 Minneapolis Paper Mill/ Pillsbury Warehouse "C"  [1867-1931]
 Northwestern Flour Mill/ Northwestern Consolidated"D" Mill  [1879-1931]
 Occidental Feed Mill  [1883-1919]
 Palisade Flour Mill  [1872-1932]
 People's Flour Mill  [1857-1870s]
 Pettit Mill/ Northwestern Consolidated Elevator "B"  [1875, 1879-1931]
 Russell Mill/ Dakota Mill/ King Midas Flour Mill  [1868-1967]
 Russell's Planing Mill/ Model Mill/ King Midas Flour Mill  [1863-1967]
 Second Bassett Sawmill  [1870-1940s]
 Union Flour Mill/_Northwestern Consolidated storage  [1863- ~1930]
 Washburn "B" Flour Mill Complex  [1866-1931]
 Washburn "C" Flour Mill Complex  [1878-1960]
 Washburn-Crosby Company Elevator No. 2  [1916-1998]
Elevators No. 2 & 3 were large grain elevators east of the Washburn A mill complex. They were separated from the complex by railroad tracks and connected by a conveyor tunnel. Elevator 2 (1916) was just west of 10th Ave S, and elevator 3 (1929) was just east (outside the Historic District). They accepted grain from rail box cars or trucks (1958) and fed the mills. When milling ended in 1965 the elevators were used for storage, with grain coming in by truck (or rail) and shipped out by rail or river barge (1969). Minneapolis bought the elevators in 1987 and General Mills (Washburn-Crosby) continued to use the elevators until 1993, when use ended and the elevators stood vacant. The end of the once heavy rail use at the falls facilitated redevelopment. The elevators were demolished 1998, and likely nothing remains.  Gold Medal Park now occupies the site.
 Zenith Flour Mill/_Northwestern Consolidated "E" Mill  [1871, 1878, 1879-1931]

Other
 Bridge No. L-9331, Tenth Ave S, north of 2nd St S., more north   [1916-?]  (now the Gold Medal Park)
 Bridge No. L-9332, Tenth Ave S, north of 2nd St S., more south   [1916-?]  (now the Gold Medal Park)
 Bridge No. L-9333, Tenth Ave S, immediately north of 2nd St S.   [1892-?]  (now the Gold Medal Park)
 Chicago, St. Paul, Minneapolis and Omaha RR Roundhouse, 6th Ave N & W River Parkway   [~1891-?] 
 Eastman tunnel  [1868-1869]
 Gateway Residential Area, along West River Parkway between Hennepin Ave and 3rd Ave S
 Hennepin Avenue Bridge Archaeological Site
 Pacific Sawmill,  W of West River Parkway between 1st and 2nd Ave. N.
 Phoenix Flour Mill/ Pillsbury Rye Mill, 101-103 Third Ave SE  [1875-1956]
 Pillsbury "A" Steam Power Plant, Hennepin Island, E of access road extension of 3rd Ave SE  [1903-1964]
River flow is variable, and particularly in the winter, mills may have to shut down from inadequate water flow. Many mills supplemented water power with steam. The first was the Pillsbury A mill with a 1,400 HP steam engine in 1884. When electricity was available from away from St. Anthony Falls (St. Croix Falls, about 1910 ) electricity was also used.
 Second East Side Platform Sawmills, East river channel between foot of Second Ave.  SE and foot of Third Ave.  [1871-1895]
 West Side Power Plant, 3rd Ave. N and West River Road

See also
 Mill Ruins Park
 Northwestern Consolidated Milling Company owned many of the west side mills and elevators
 St. Anthony Falls Hydroelectric Development
 Saint Anthony Falls - Industry

Notes

External links
 
  the application from the City of Minneapolis to the National Park Service to place the St. Anthony Falls Historic District on the National Register of Historic Places (it was placed there). Consists of the original 1971 application (some pages in the wrong order) and a much longer 1991 addition. This is the definitive list of contributing resources. It has extensive descriptions of "contributing resources" and sections on the significance of the district.Location of the sites in the waterpower district  can be found on the map on pdf pg 105.Much the information in this article from before 1991 comes from this source. 
 History of the area a little larger than the Falls Historic District and the preservation of the buildings. Good information on the history of structures and their reuse. Also on new construction, some of which fits in with the historic, and some of which definitely doesn't. Good pictures of all.A significant source of information in this article.
  Pictures from the St. Anthony Historic District are available at the NRHP.  There are pictures, historic and recent, for many of the properties above.
 
 Kane, Lucile (1987). The Falls of St. Anthony: The Waterfall That Built Minneapolis. Minnesota Historical Society.  A heavily footnoted standard history of the development at the Falls
 A walking tour of the falls area with 40 stops and descriptions at each stop. About 70% of the features are contributing resources.
 A map of the falls area with numbers and a list of what is at that number. The list is the same properties as the tour above.
 Over half of these entries are not contributing resources or are not in the current St. Anthony Falls Historic District

Buildings and structures in Minneapolis
National Register of Historic Places in Minneapolis
Houses on the National Register of Historic Places in Minnesota